Hayman Trophy is the inter-district senior men's cricket tournament organised by Bihar Cricket Association in the Indian state of Bihar. The tournament is named after A.M.Hayman, the founding president of Bihar Cricket Association. The tournament is recognised by the Board of Control for Cricket in India.

The first semi-final was played between Bhagalpur and Khagaria at Bhagalpur from 11 to 13 April 2018 in which Bhagalpur was the winner. The second semi-final was played between Begusarai and Muzaffarpur at Begusarai from 12 to 14 April 2018, in which Muzaffarpur was the winner. The final of 2017-18 Hayman Trophy 'A' Division was played between Bhagalpur and Muzaffarpur at Bhagalpur from 19 to 22 April 2018.

Division 'A' winners

Division 'B' winners

See also
 
2013-14 Hayman Trophy
2014-15 Hayman Trophy
2015-16 Hayman Trophy
2016-17 Hayman Trophy
2017-18 Hayman Trophy

References

4

Indian domestic cricket competitions
Cricket in Bihar